"Sunny" is a song by Morrissey, released as a single in December 1995. It was released by EMI to try to cash in on Morrissey's Southpaw Grammar album that had been released that year by RCA and consisted of three songs that Morrissey had recorded while under contract to EMI.

"Sunny" had initially been planned to appear on the "Boxers" single released in January 1995, and "Black-Eyed Susan" had at one point been allocated to be the B-side of "The More You Ignore Me, the Closer I Get" in 1994.

Track listings

7" (Parlophone R6243)

Cassette (Parlophone TCR6243)

CD (Parlophone CDR6243)

Reception
Jack Rabid of AllMusic described Sunny as "pleasant, breezy, jovial, and winsome, but the melody is not memorable."  He expressed a preference for the B-sides: "As has been the case for Morrissey's whole career, the B-sides overshadow the A-side."

Musicians
Morrissey – voice
Alain Whyte – guitar
Boz Boorer – guitar
Jonny Bridgwood – bass guitar
Woodie Taylor – drums

Live performances
The song was performed live by Morrissey between 1995 and 2000.

References

Morrissey songs
1995 singles
Songs written by Morrissey
Songs written by Alain Whyte